Haakon Arntzen is a Canadian politician. He represented the Whitehorse, Yukon electoral district of Copperbelt in the Yukon Legislative Assembly as a member of the Yukon Party from 2002 to 2005.

Political career

First elected in the 2002 territorial election, Arntzen served as a backbench government MLA during the first part of his term. He was elected to represent the newly created Whitehorse riding of Copperbelt on behalf of the Yukon Party, which was swept into government after defeating the Yukon Liberals of Pat Duncan.

He left the Yukon Party caucus on April 28, 2004 to sit as an Independent after being criminally charged with the indecent assault of two teenage girls in the 1970s.

On May 13, 2005, Arntzen was convicted of three counts of indecent assault. The Official Opposition sought, but failed, to earn unanimous consent of the Legislative Assembly to call upon Arntzen to resign. Though Arntzen was not present for the vote, the government denied unanimity, with Yukon Premier Dennis Fentie stating that the motion was premature as Arntzen had neither been sentenced, nor stated whether or not he intended to appeal the verdict. The media also called upon Arnzten to resign - or for Fentie to support his expulsion from the Assembly. Fentie never publicly called for Arntzen to resign.

Arntzen resigned his seat on September 9, 2005 and he was succeeded in a by-election by newly elected Liberal leader Arthur Mitchell, whom Arnzten had defeated in the riding of Copperbelt in the 2002 election. Despite Arntzen's resignation, the Yukon Party retained its majority status in the legislature.

Legal Resolution

Initially handed a 15-month community sentence, Arnzten appealed his conviction - as did the Crown, which demanded a stiffer sentence. Arnzten ultimately succeeded in his appeal, and a new trial was scheduled. However, before it could proceed, the Crown stayed the charges, citing a loss of reliable evidence in the case over time. One of Arnzten's alleged victims had also filed similar charges against Arnzten in Hay River, Northwest Territories in 2007, but was unsuccessful. The judge at the time had stated that Arnzten's evidence was more reliable.

Electoral record

Yukon general election, 2002

|-

 
|Liberal
|Arthur Mitchell
|align="right"| 312
|align="right"| 32.6%
|align="right"| –
|-

|NDP
|Lillian Grubach-Hambrook
|align="right"| 263
|align="right"| 27.5%
|align="right"| –
|- bgcolor="white"
!align="left" colspan=3|Total
!align="right"| 957
!align="right"| 100.0%
!align="right"| –

References

Yukon Party MLAs
Living people
People convicted of indecent assault
Politicians from Whitehorse
Politicians convicted of sex offences
Canadian politicians convicted of crimes
Norwegian emigrants to Canada
Year of birth missing (living people)